"Ain't That Peculiar" is a 1965 song recorded by American soul musician Marvin Gaye for the Tamla (Motown) label.

Background
The single was produced by Smokey Robinson, and written by Robinson, and  fellow Miracles members Bobby Rogers, Pete Moore, and Marv Tarplin. "Ain't That Peculiar" features Gaye, with The Andantes on backing vocals, singing about the torment of a painful relationship.

Billboard said that "penetrating hard-drive dance beat backs another soulful, first-rate Gaye performance."  Cash Box described it as a "rollicking, rhythmic pop-blues romantic handclapper about a love-struck fella who can’t get along without his gal."

Chart success
The single was Gaye's second U.S. million seller successfully duplicating its predecessor "I'll Be Doggone", from earlier in 1965 by topping Billboard'''s Hot R&B Singles chart in the fall of 1965, peaking at number 8 on the Billboard Hot 100. It became one of Gaye's signature 1960s recordings, and was his best-known solo hit before 1968's "I Heard It Through the Grapevine".

Diamond Reo version

Hard rock band Diamond Reo from Pittsburgh, Pennsylvania released their version of "Ain't That Peculiar" in early 1975. The single peaked at #44 on the Billboard Hot 100 on February 8 of the same year, becoming their only hit. 
Cover by Diamond Reo is considered one of the first recordings to use the talk box.

 
Other cover versions
A cover by all-female rock band Fanny on their 1972 album Fanny Hill reached number 85 on the Billboard Hot 100. 
A cover by R&B singer Stevie Woods reached number 54 on the Billboard Hot R&B Singles in 1984.
A cover by New Grass Revival peaked at number 53 on the Billboard'' Hot Country Singles chart in 1986.

Personnel
Lead vocals by Marvin Gaye
Background vocals by the Andantes: Marlene Barrow, Jackie Hicks and Louvain Demps
Drums by Uriel Jones
Guitar by Marv Tarplin
Other instrumentation by the Funk Brothers

References

1965 songs
1965 singles
Songs written by Marv Tarplin
Songs written by Bobby Rogers
Songs written by Smokey Robinson
Songs written by Warren "Pete" Moore
Marvin Gaye songs
New Grass Revival songs
Song recordings produced by Smokey Robinson
Tamla Records singles